Jinji Road is a station on Line 9 of the Shanghai Metro. It began passenger trial operation with the rest of phase 3 of Line 9, an easterly extension with 9 new stations, on December 30, 2017.

In the future, it is also expected to be the western terminus of the Chongming line, which is currently in the planning stages and would run to Chongming District.

References 

Railway stations in Shanghai
Shanghai Metro stations in Pudong
Railway stations in China opened in 2017
Line 9, Shanghai Metro